Mount Gunn is a very large mountain,  high, standing in the Convoy Range about  northwest of Mount Gran in Victoria Land, Antarctica. It was photographed in 1957 by the New Zealand Northern Survey Party of the Commonwealth Trans-Antarctic Expedition (1956–58) and named by them for Bernard M. Gunn, a member of the party.

References

Mountains of Victoria Land
Scott Coast